Hudson Hawk is a platform game developed by Special FX Ltd. for the Amstrad CPC, Amiga, Atari ST, Commodore 64 and ZX Spectrum based on the film of the same name. It was released in 1991 and published by Ocean Software. Sony Imagesoft released it in the US for the Game Boy and NES. In Spain it was published as El Gran Halcon, the Spanish title for the film. An SNES version was in development, but was cancelled when the film flopped.

Gameplay
The player assumes the role of Hudson Hawk, a cat burglar. He is sent on a mission to steal three Da Vinci artifacts. Walking through various levels in this platform game, the player must avoid sounding alarms. In addition, security guards and dogs show up to hamper the mission. Hudson Hawk can pacify the enemies by punching them or launching tennis balls at them.

References

External links

 https://www.giantbomb.com/hudson-hawk/3030-19918/

1991 video games
Amiga games
Amstrad CPC games
Video games based on films
Epic/Sony Records games
Atari ST games
Commodore 64 games
Game Boy games
Nintendo Entertainment System games
Platform games
ZX Spectrum games
Video games about crime
Ocean Software games
Video games developed in the United Kingdom